CNBLUE is a South Korean pop-rock idol band. The quartet made its debut in Japan under AI Entertainment in 2009, where it released its first two independent mini-albums Now or Never and Voice. Written entirely in English, the former contained two songs by frontman Jung Yong-hwa ("Just Please" and "Love Revolution"), while the latter contained one ("Y, Why..."). The band proceeded to debut in its home country under FNC Entertainment with the mini-album Bluetory (2010), in which Jung contributed to the Korean lyrics of two tracks alongside the record label's CEO Han Seong-ho: "Love Revolution" and "Y, Why...". With CNBLUE's followup Bluelove, in addition to the songs penned solely by Jung ("Tattoo" and "Love Light"), drummer Kang Min-hyuk co-wrote "Sweet Holiday" with Han.

In 2011, CNBLUE released its first full-length album First Step in South Korea. Jung wrote or co-wrote five of the songs, while the band as a whole is credited for writing two additional tracks. A month later, the band released the special mini-album First Step +1 Thank You; Jung contributed lyrics to two tracks, while guitarist and vocalist Lee Jong-hyun co-wrote one song. Later that year, CNBLUE released its final independent album 392 in Japan. A majority of the track were written solely by Jung, in addition to Lee's singular contribution. The release of mini-album Ear Fun (2012) saw Jung aid in the songwriting on three out of six tracks. In the band's first studio album Code Name Blue (2012) under Warner Music Japan, Jung wrote or co-wrote seven of the album's tracks.

With the release of Re:Blue (2013), "I'm Sorry" marked the first time Jung contributed to the lyrics of a lead single in South Korea. With the exception of one song, he also wrote the remaining tracks on the record. Since the release of What Turns You On? later that year, nearly all songs have been entirely written or co-written by Jung and Lee. The exceptions had lyrics provided by bassist Lee Jung-shin.

Songs

References

 
Cnblue